A Friend Will Come Tonight (French: Un ami viendra ce soir) is a 1946 French drama film directed by Raymond Bernard and starring Michel Simon, Madeleine Sologne and Paul Bernard. The film's sets were designed by the art director Robert Gys.

Cast
 Michel Simon as Michel Lemaret  
 Madeleine Sologne as Hélène Asselin  
 Paul Bernard as Le docteur Maurice Tiller  
 Louis Salou as Le commissaire Louis Martin 
 Saturnin Fabre as Philippe Prunier  
 Marcel André as Le docteur Lestrade  
 Lily Mounet as Alexandrine Jeanne Constance Létitia, baronne de Pontignac  
 Yvette Andréyor as Mademoiselle Béatrice  
 Jacques Clancy as Jacques Leroy, le pianiste  
 Daniel Gélin as Pierre Ribault  
 Claude Lehmann as Le docteur Pigaut  
 Cécilia Paroldi as Claire, la postière 
 Howard Vernon as Robert Langlois, le muet  
 Jane Marny as Madame Belin  
 Raoul Marco as Le maire  
 Pierre Sergeol as Charles Levallier  
 Odette Barencey as Une serveuse de l'auberge  
 Georges Brisset
 Claude Vernier as Le second officier allemand  
 Gregori Chmara as L'officier allemand au monocle 
 Paul Darcy 
 Jo Dest as Un allemand  
 Palmyre Levasseur as Une villageoise 
 Fernand Liesse as Anselme  
 Darling Légitimus 
 Maria Mauban
 Fritz Schmiedel as Le soldat allemand faisant l'appel
 Maurice Schutz

Production
Guy Lefranc was assistant director on the movie.

References

Bibliography 
 Rège, Philippe. Encyclopedia of French Film Directors, Volume 1. Scarecrow Press, 2009.

External links 
 

1946 films
1946 drama films
French drama films
1940s French-language films
French black-and-white films
Films directed by Raymond Bernard
Films scored by Arthur Honegger
1940s French films